King Khan and the Shrines, sometimes referred to as King Khan and (His) Sensational Shrines are a Berlin-based garage rock and psychedelic soul band.

History
The band was founded in 1999 by then 22-year-old King Khan, formerly of Canadian garage rock outfits The Spaceshits (where he operated under the pseudonym Blacksnake) and Kukamongas. The band is noted for its impressive stage antics. Typically King Khan is scantily clad, and the overwhelming frontman. His performances feature cheerleader/go-go dancer Bamboorella and a mixture of instrumentation including, but not limited to: keyboard, baritone saxophone, guitar, bass, and drums.

Khan formerly played with fellow former Spaceshit member, Mark Sultan, in the King Khan & BBQ Show, a doo-wop and punk inspired two-man band and is currently with Sultan and the Black Lips in a garage gospel super-group called Almighty Defenders. Sultan mentioned in 2010 that he and the Shrines have "bandied about" recording and singing some songs together.

The original lineup of the (Sensational) Shrines consisted of King Khan on vocals and guitars, Mr. Speedfinger on guitar, Boom Boom Jennes on bass, John Boy Adonis on "big beat," Sam Cook on trumpet, percussionist Ron (a.k.a. Rahn) Streeter (who formerly played for Ike and Tina Turner, Bo Diddley, Curtis Mayfield, Stevie Wonder, and Al Jarreau), Ben Ra (the IT guy) on saxophone and Mr. Tom Bone on trombone. Eccentric French organist Fredovitch joined the lineup a week before the group recorded their first album at Toe Rag Studios in London.

Discography

Albums

Compilation albums

References

External links

King Khan and the Shrines on Myspace
Video: Exclusive live video on Punkrockvids.com
King Khan and the Shrines page at Hazelwood Records

Garage punk groups
Canadian punk rock groups
Musical groups from Montreal
Musical groups established in 1999
1999 establishments in Quebec
Merge Records artists
Canadian garage rock groups